Jan Mikael Nilsson (born 28 September 1968) is a Swedish former footballer who played as a defender. He most notably played for IFK Göteborg with which he won six Swedish Championships and played in the UEFA Champions League. A full international between 1991 and 1996, he won 22 caps for the Sweden national team and represented his country at UEFA Euro 1992 and at the 1994 FIFA World Cup where Sweden finished third.

Club career 
Nilsson played for a local club called Tomtens IF and IFK Falköping until 1987 when he moved to IFK Göteborg, where he stayed until he ended his active career in 2001 due to an eye injury. During these years, he played 609 first team matches, which is a club record. He also won six Swedish Championships with the club and played in several European competitions.

International career 
Nilsson played 22 international matches for the Sweden national team, and was part of the UEFA Euro 1992 and 1994 FIFA World Cup squads, he did however not play any matches in any of the tournaments. He also represented the Sweden U19 and U21 teams, and competed at the 1990 UEFA European Under-21 Championship where Sweden reached the semi-finals before being eliminated by the Soviet Union.

Legacy 
In ITV's Greatest Champions League Goals programme, Nilsson's two strikes against PSV Eindhoven were number twenty and nineteen on the list of the top 50 goals, including a magnificent free-kick with an insane amount of curve, which probably is what he is best known for. One of Clive Tyldesley's famous quotes- "Now they know he can shoot, oh they know he can shoot", referred to Nilsson's second strike against PSV.

Career statistics

International

Honours 
IFK Göteborg

 Swedish Champion: 1990, 1991, 1993, 1994, 1995, 1996
Sweden

 FIFA World Cup third place: 1994
Individual
 Årets ärkeängel: 1994
Stor Grabb: 1995

Records

 Most appearances for IFK Göteborg: 609

References

External links

1968 births
Living people
Swedish footballers
Sweden international footballers
Sweden under-21 international footballers
Sweden youth international footballers
Allsvenskan players
IFK Göteborg players
UEFA Euro 1992 players
1994 FIFA World Cup players
Association football defenders